Michel Bulteau is a French poet, essayist, occasional musician and experimental filmmaker, born on 8 October 1949 in Arcueil.

Biography
When he was twenty-two, he contributed with seventeen other young poets, including Matthieu Messagier, Jean-Jacques Faussot, Jacques Ferry, Patrick Geoffrois and Thierry Lamarre to a poetry bundle entitled 'Manifeste Électrique aux paupières de jupes' (Electrical Manifesto with Eyelids of Skirts), which was published in 1971 by Le Soleil Noir. The poetry bundle entitled 'Manifeste Électrique aux paupières de jupes'  was a literary manifest that caused a stir in the literary world. Encouraged by the Belgian-French poet and writer, Henri Michaux, he continued his quest as a rebellious poet.

In 1976, he moved to New York where he became friends with beat writers, painters and pop punk musicians. Bulteau is, in the words of William S. Burroughs, an "explorer of untouched psychic areas."

Work

Michel Bulteau was only twenty-one years when '7, Retomba des nuits'  (1970), his first book of poetry, was published. The poems in this collection are dark, tragic and desperate and are a reflection of the violence and freedom of the Beat Generation as well as the generation of black surrealism. He would publish many more poetry collections which are all characterised by a hypersensibility. This places him firmly in the tradition of great French writers such as Baudelaire, Nerval and Rimbaud. Bulteau has written that "Being modern is the most dangerous artistic route. Being modern means refusing to be untrue, unreal."(Aérer le présent, 1999).

Michel Bulteau has written more than sixty books including poetry books, biographies of famous persons associated with the beat generation and avant-garde art scene (Allen Ginsberg, James Dean, Andy Warhol) as well as journals and essays. He has been an editor of the Nouvelle Revue de Paris in which he published Houellebecq's early poems.

Michel Bulteau is also active as a musician. He was the lead singer of Mahogany Brain, a band with which he aimed to realise his ideal of a marriage between poetry and rock'n roll. The band played pre-punk music that was influenced by drugs (the original cover of their debut showed an arm with a syringe). Their music was a crossing of Velvet Underground's White Light/White Heat and Captain Beefheart's Trout Mask Replica. The band was quite short-lived: they played their only concert in the summer of 1970 at the Lucemarie during which Bulteau threw bricks at the few members of the audience. After that they became a studio band recording two records. In December 1970 Mahogany Brain recorded the album With (Junk-Saucepan) When (Spoon-Trigger) released by the Futura label early the next year and they also provided the soundtrack to a short film of Bulteau's, Main Line. Another record, Smooth Sick Lights, was recorded on a single day in June 1972, but only released several years in 1976 later by the Pole label. Mahogany Brain issued a new record under the title With/Without in 2004 on Mello Records. Michel Bulteau has recorded a maxi 45 with Elliott Murphy (1989) and a further three solo albums during the nineties and in 2004.

Michel Bulteau has directed and contributed to a number of avant-garde movies which place him in the tradition of experimental directors such as Kenneth Anger, Stan Brackage and Jean Cocteau.

In Fiction

Michel Bulteau appears as a character in the novel The Savage Detectives by Chilean author Roberto Bolaño. In the novel Michel Bulteau meets Ulises Lima, one of the main characters of the novel, in Paris circa 1976. Later, a Peruvian poet, Roberto Rosas, becomes obsessed with his poem "Sang de Satin" as he is trying to translate it into Spanish.

Bibliography 
 7, Retomba des nuits (textes), Aglis Press, 1970
 Manifeste Électrique Aux Paupières de Jupes, Le Soleil Noir, 1971
 Poème A Effraction-Laque, J-J Pauvert, 1972
 Parvis à l'écho des cils (collectif), J-J Pauvert, 1972
 Sang de satin, illustrations de Jacques Hérold, Première personne, 1972
 Les cristaux de foliesuivideWatcris88mots, Electric Press, 1973
 Poudrier de dent (collectif), J-J Faussot éd, 1973
 Ether-Mouth, Slit, Hypodermique, Seghers, 1974
 Venins (collectif), J-J Faussot, 1974
 On My Lap (collectif), Electric Press, 1975
 Des siècles de folie dans les calèches étroites, Belfond, 1976
 Le Maître des abysses, La Lampe Voilée, 1977
 Euridyce d'Esprits, Bourgois, 1979
 La Pyramide de la Vierge, Bourgois, 1979
 Îles serrées, Belfond, 1980
 Enfant Dandy Poème, Bordas et fils, 1980
 L'Aiguille de diamant de l'anéantissement, Le Soleil Noir, 1980
 Discours de la beauté et du cœur, Bordas et fils, 1981
 Le Martyre de M de Palmyre, Éditions du Fourneau, 1982
 Mythologie des filles des eaux, Ed du Rocher, 1982, 1997
 Khôl, A l'Europe galante, 1984
 Anchise et Anadyre, Le Temps qu'il fait, 1984
 James Dean, Presses de la Cité, 1985
 Paul-Jean Toulet l'enchanteur désenchanté, Ed J & D, 1987
 Le club des longues moustaches, Quai Voltaire, 1988
 Flowers (d'après Warhol), La Différence, 1989
 Minuties, La Différence, 1989
 Masques et modèles, La Différence, 1989
 Baron Corvo, l'exilé de Venise, Ed du Rocher, 1990
 Insinuations perfides, Éditions du Scalaire, 1990
 Mort d'un rebelle, Ed du Rocher, 1991
 Poème 1966–1974, La Différence, 1993
 La vie des autres (instantanés), La Différence, 1995
 Poet's Life 1, Electric Press, 1995
 Les analogies de la mort, Electric Press, 1995
 Le Yémen, Ed ACR, 1995
 Le monde d'en face (nouvelles), Ed du Rocher, 1996
 Lanky, derrière la salle de bain, 1996
 XVIII Poèmes (avec Matthieu Messagier), Luvah, 1996, Electric Press
 Post-Peinture et Pré-Musique, Electric Press, 1997
 Aérer le présent (avec Jean-Jacques Fauffot), Paroles d'Aube, 1998
 Prose and Spoon, Electric Press, 1999
 Chérubins(nouvelles), La Revue Commune, 1999
 À New York au milieu des spectres, La Différence, 2000
 Breast pocket notes sur Roy Lichtenstein, L'Échoppe, 2000
 Poet's life III, avec Touhami Ennadre, Les amis du Club, 2000
 Sérénité moyenne (poèmes 1990–1996), Gallimard, 2000
 L'effrayeur (roman), Gallimard, 2000
 La Reine du Pop, La Différence, 2001
 Les zéros absolus (nouvelles), Ed du Rocher, 2001
 Proses bien déprosées (avec Matthieu Messagier), Electric Press, 2001
 Un héros de New York, La Différence, 2003
 Allen Ginsberg, le chant de l'Amérique, La Différence, 2007
 Hoola Hoops, poèmes 1996–2004, La Différence, 2007
 Les Hypnotiseurs, La Différence, 2008
 New York est une fête, La Différence, 2008
 Andy Warhol, le désir d'être peintre, La Différence, 2009
 Apollon jeté à terre, La Différence, 2010

Filmography 
 Le destin d'un tueur Two versions, black & white, silent, 8 mm, 3' /color, 9', 1963
 Dernier Rôle 1967
 Une voyelle B in collaboration with Matthieu Messagier, 1968
 La Direction de l'odeur A film of Matthieu Messagier Camera : Michel Bulteau With Jean-Pierre Cretin, Michel Bulteau, Jean-Jacques Faussot and Matthieu Messagier, 1968
 Main Line Camera : Michel Bulteau and Patrick Geoffrois Music : Mahogany Brain Actors: Adeline, Patrick Geoffrois,
 Mine and Michel Bulteau, 1971
 Asnaviràm Music: AC Bhaktivedanta Swami Prabhupada, 1974
 Un naufrage s'offrait Music : Matt Lucas, Little Tony and his brothers, Chris Montez Actor : Adeline 1974–1975
 Impératrice Music : Claudia Muzio Actor: Adeline 1974–1976
 On the Radio, on the screen Actor : Michel Bulteau 1976
 La Lisière de la miséricorde Actor : Adeline and Michel Bulteau 1976
 Astérie Camera : Philippe Puicouyoul, 1979
 Yémen, temps du sacré A film by Layth Abdulamir, script and text by Michel Bulteau 1994
 FiLm 1995
 MB né à Arcueil Camera : Pascal Auger 1996
 Leila's Papers With Natasha Fuentes and Nick Name 1996–1998
 Moving Back in Times Actor: Virginie Petracco 1999

Discography 
 With (Junk-Saucepan) When (Spoon-Trigger), with Mahogany Brain, LP, (Futura, 1971), (Réédition, Mellow, 2001)
 Smooth Sick Lights, with Mahogany Brain, LP, (Pole, 1976) (Réédition CD, Spalax Music, 1997)
 Spleens with Elliot Murphy Maxi 45T, (Mix It/New Rose, 1989
 Archidoxe, Ed Paroles d'Aube, 1994
 Dans un monde sonore, (Radio France, 1997)
 Rinçures, (Fractal, 1999)
 Hero Poet, LP, 2004

References 
 Mahogany Brain, on Rock Made in France http://rockmadeinfrance.canalblog.com/archives/2009/10/04/15304807.html.
 Michel Bulteau on Fractal Records http://www.fractal-records.com/05artists/bulteau.htm

External links 
 

French film directors
20th-century French poets
French essayists
Winners of the Prix Broquette-Gonin (literature)
1949 births
People from Hauts-de-Seine
Living people